Old Ways is an album by Neil Young.

Old Ways may also refer to:
 "Old Ways", song by Neil Young from Old Ways
 "Old Ways", song by Demi Lovato from Confident

See also
 The Old Ways, a 2020 American horror film
The Old Ways, an award winning 2012 book by Robert Macfarlane